In cultural anthropology, a leveling mechanism is a practice that acts to ensure social equality, usually by shaming or humbling members of a group that attempt to put themselves above other members.

One commonly given example of a leveling mechanism is the !Kung practice of "shaming the meat", particularly as illustrated by the Canadian anthropologist Richard Borshay Lee in his article "Eating Christmas in the Kalahari" (1969). When Lee gave the !Kung an ox as a Christmas gift, the !Kung responded by insulting the gift, calling it a "bag of bones" and joking that they would have to eat the horns because there was no meat on it. Lee later asked a man named Tomazo why his gift was insulted in this way. He responded that it was because the gift was arrogant. Lee asked what he meant by this and was told:

See also 
 
 Law of Jante
 Tall poppy syndrome

References

Cultural anthropology
Pride